The Jardin Animalier de Monaco is a zoo located on the Esplanade Rainer III, in Monaco's Fontvieille ward, on the southern side of the Rock of Monaco. It was established by Rainier III, Prince of Monaco in 1954. 250 animals are held in the zoo, representing some 50 species.

The zoo is a hectare in size, set over four levels on the rock. None of the animals were purchased; all have come from donations, circuses, or abandoned animals and those seized by circuses. Five animals came to the zoo after the 2009 closure of the zoo at Saint-Jean-Cap-Ferrat.

The zoo formerly contained leopards, but these were released into the wild due to the efforts of campaigner Virginia McKenna, founder of the Born Free Foundation. The two leopards, Pitou and Sirius, had been kept in a five-meter enclosure with a concrete floor. McKenna had previously visited Monaco nine times in an attempt to petition Prince Rainier for the animal's release, she was finally granted a royal audience with Prince Albert after his ascension to the Monegasque throne in 2005. Albert agreed to release the leopards to Born Free, with a promise to release the camel and hippo in the zoo at a later date. Albert also promised to turn the Zoological Gardens into a petting zoo.

References

External links

Zoos in Monaco
Zoos established in 1954
1954 establishments in Monaco
Articles needing infobox zoo